Thomas Johnson (July 4, 1812 – April 7, 1906) was a prominent Kentucky politician. He was born in Montgomery County, Kentucky and represented the state in the Provisional Confederate Congress.

Johnson served as an officer in the Confederate Army during the American Civil War. After the war he served in the Kentucky House of Representatives from 1876 to 1877 and in the Kentucky State Senate from 1878 to 1882.

Footnotes

1812 births
1906 deaths
Confederate States Army officers
Deputies and delegates to the Provisional Congress of the Confederate States
19th-century American politicians
Kentucky state senators
Members of the Kentucky House of Representatives
People from Montgomery County, Kentucky